Worley is a surname. Notable people with the surname include:

Al Worley (1946–2020), American football player
Allen B. Worley, American admiral
Anna Lee Keys Worley (died 1961), American politician
Barbara Worley (1934–2014), Australian sports administrator
Becky Worley (born 1971), American journalist and broadcaster
Billie Worley, American actor
Brian Worley (born 1972), American television host
Charles Worley (1853–1906), British architect
Chris Worley (born 1995), American football player
Daryl Worley (born 1995), American football player
Darryl Worley (born 1964), American country singer and songwriter
Ed Worley, American politician
Elizabeth K. Worley (1904–2004), American zoologist and microbiologist
Eugene Worley (1908–1974), American politician and jurist
Francis Worley (1913–2003), American politician
Harry Worley (born 1988), English footballer
Henry William Worley (1877–1938), British-born American politician
James D. Worley (born 1959), American convicted murderer
Jo Anne Worley (born 1937), American television and film actress
John Worley (1919–1999), American saxophonist and composer
Justin Worley (born 1992), American football player
Kate Worley (1958–2004), American comic book author
Kenneth L. Worley (1948–1968), American marine and Medal of Honor recipient
Laura Davis Worley (1849–1937), American dairy farmer and secretary
Len Worley (born 1937), English footballer
Matt Worley (born 1997), Hong Konger rugby union player
Nancy Worley (1951–2021), American politician
Paul Worley (born 1950), American record producer and guitarist
Richard Worley (died 1718/1719), English pirate
Rick Worley, American cartoonist
Rob Worley, American writer and editor
Robert Worley (1850–1930), British architect
Robert F. Worley (1919–1968), American fighter pilot and general
Ron Worley, American politician
Satch Worley (born 1948) NASCAR driver
Seth Worley (born 1984), American film director and writer
Shayla Worley (born 1990), American gymnast
Tessa Worley (born 1989), French skier
Tim Worley (born 1966), American football player
Vance Worley (born 1987), American baseball player
William G. Worley, American politician